Hellen M. Brooks (April 18, 1862 – ?) was an American educator and politician.

Born in the town of Fulton, Wisconsin in Rock County, Wisconsin, Brooks went to Milton College and received her degree in education from Milwaukee Normal School in education. She taught in several schools and was a principal. She lived in Coloma, Wisconsin. Brooks was involved in the Red Cross and Liberty Loan committees during World War II. She served on the school board. Brooks served in the Wisconsin State Assembly in 1925 and was a Republican.

Notes

1862 births
People from Fulton, Wisconsin
People from Coloma, Wisconsin
Milton College alumni
University of Wisconsin–Milwaukee alumni
Educators from Wisconsin
American women educators
School board members in Wisconsin
Women state legislators in Wisconsin
Republican Party members of the Wisconsin State Assembly
Year of death missing